Myeloconis parva is a species of corticolous (bark-dwelling), crustose lichen in the family Trichotheliaceae. Found in Amazonian Brazil, it was formally described as a new species in 1996 by Patrick M. McCarthy and John Elix.

Description

The thallus is continuous, with a matte to slightly glossy surface that is closely appressed or somewhat raised near the margin. Closer to the centre, the thallus is raised, peeling and flaking, and very uneven, and is approximately 30–100 μm thick. The lichen has no , but has an uppermost layer that is amorphous and 6–10 μm thick. The algal cells are 5–12 by 5–10 μm, and the medulla contains masses of sulphur-yellow crystals that are sometimes exposed. When treated with K, the crystals turn reddish, but they do not fluoresce under UV light.

Ascomata are very uncommon in Myeloconis parva, and are mostly immature. They are almost entirely immersed in the thallus and have an outwardly inconspicuous appearance. The ascomata are irregularly convex thalline swellings, each with a shallow, 70–100 μm diameter, apical depression and a minute, medium to dark brown ostiole. The ascomatal wall is dark olive-brown to almost black, 50–90 μm thick near the apex, and 40–60 μm thick at the base. The  is pale to medium brown and is approximately 20 μm thick. The  is spherical and is 0.2–0.4 mm in diameter, while the  filaments are 0.7–1 μm thick. Mature asci have not been observed. They have 21–26 transverse divisions, with each loculus having 1 or 2 (sometimes 3) longitudinal or diagonal divisions. The ascospores have a 2–3 μm-thick wall and are 94–132 by 18–23 μm in size.

References

Gyalectales
Lichen species
Lichens described in 1996
Lichens of Brazil
Taxa named by John Alan Elix